All Saints Church is an Episcopal church in the Diocese of Brechin, located in the Scottish village of Glencarse, Perth and Kinross.

Still in use as a congregational church, the building is constructed in the half-timbered style, and on 9 June 1981 was listed as a category C listed building.

References

Episcopal church buildings in Scotland
Churches in Perth and Kinross
Listed churches in Scotland
Category C listed buildings in Perth and Kinross